Duke basketball can refer to:

Duke Blue Devils men's basketball
Duke Blue Devils women's basketball